HNLMS Nautilus may refer to the following ships of the Royal Netherlands Navy:

 , a unique minelayer sunk during the Second World War
 , a 

Royal Netherlands Navy ship names